The New Zealand Legal Information Institute (NZLII) is operated by the University of Otago Faculty of Law with assistance from the University of Canterbury and Victoria University, Wellington. It contains more than 100 databases of New Zealand law including many decision from Courts and Tribunals that are not available anywhere else, including from commercial operators. It operates using voluntary labour and grants from the New Zealand Law Foundation.
NZLII is a member of the Free Access to Law Movement.

References 
 Buckingham D ‘What’s in a Name?: New Zealand and the growth of free on-line legal information’ [2005] CompLRes 2; 7th Law via Internet Conference, Vila, Vanuatu
 Section on NZLII in Greenleaf, G Legal Information Institutes and the Free Access to Law Movement, Globalex website, February 2008

External links
 New Zealand Legal Information Institute

University of Otago
Law of New Zealand
Free Access to Law Movement